Oenochroma vetustaria, the ribbed wine moth, is a species of moth of the  family Geometridae. It is found in South Eastern Australia.

References

Oenochrominae
Moths of Australia
Moths described in 1860